The London Economic (TLE) is a digital newspaper based in the capital of the UK. It rose to prominence during the 2017 United Kingdom general election when it ran the most-shared political story on social media for that election cycle.

History

The London Economic emerged from a political blog sharing platform created by Jack Peat and Joe Mellor in 2012.  It was developed through to 2014 into an alternative news website in an attempt to redress the "political power of the mainstream media", according to editor-in-chief Jack Peat.

Its scepticism of the mainstream media has given it an alternative media tag, one shared by political blogs such as The Canary, Captain Ska and websites such as Novara Media.

In June 2017, Peat joined Matt Turner of Evolve Politics, Stephen Glover of the Daily Mail, Aaron Bastani of Novara Media, Michael Heaver of Westmonster, Eve Pollard and David Yelland to discuss whether Britain's newspapers have lost their influence on British politics.

Ownership

In April 2020, The London Economic was taken over by the venture capital firm, Greencastle Capital Limited, who now hold a controlling 51% stake in the outlet.

Criticism

Following their takeover, The London Economic encountered criticism after it emerged that Greencastle Capital Limited's owner, David Sefton, has significant links to the fossil fuel industry.

Political standpoint

The London Economic was generally supportive of Jeremy Corbyn, the last leader of the Labour Party, but has run editorials from anti-Corbyn politicians such as David Blunkett and London Conservative Party councillors.

The website took a pro-Remain standpoint on the 2016 United Kingdom European Union membership referendum.

Notable stories
The London Economic has published a number of stories which have been notable enough to be picked up by mainstream media outlets.

NHS capped expenditure process

Following the Conservative–DUP agreement The London Economic published capped expenditure proposals outlined by Health secretary Jeremy Hunt which were claimed to ration NHS services, lengthen waiting times and lead to a "postcode lottery for your healthcare".

According to the article leaked by Shadow Health Secretary Jonathan Ashworth to The London Economic NHS managers were instructed to “think the unthinkable” to find savings which could lead to "staff cuts, units shut and treatments rationed or restricted".

Insulate Britain protests

Extinction Rebellion co-founder Roger Hallam appeared on The London Economic's podcast Unbreak The Planet to discuss the Insulate Britain protests, saying he would "block an ambulance" in order to get the campaign group’s message across.

Explaining his motives, he described climate change as "the biggest crime in human history imposed by the rich against the global poor."

Readership
Describing its audience, The London Economic said it appealed in particular to "young professionals predominantly based in London".

See also
ConservativeHome, a centre-right political blog
Left Foot Forward, a left-wing political blog
Paul Staines, a British-Irish right-wing political blogger
Political Scrapbook, a left-wing political blog
The Canary, a left-wing new media outlet

References

External links
 Official Website

British political websites
Internet properties established in 2014
2014 establishments in the United Kingdom
Left-wing politics in the United Kingdom
Alternative journalism organizations
British news websites